Embassy of France in Ankara is France's diplomatic mission to Turkey. It is located at Paris Street, Kavaklıdere, Çankaya. It is designed by Albert Laprade.

See also
Diplomatic missions of France
Foreign relations of France
France–Turkey relations

External links 
 French Embassy in Ankara

Ankara
France
France–Turkey relations